1906 in philosophy

Events

Publications

Births 
 February 22 - Humayun Kabir (died 1969)
 April 28 - Kurt Gödel (died 1978)
 October 14 - Hannah Arendt (died 1975)

Deaths 
 January 25 - Émile Boutmy (born 1835)

Philosophy
20th-century philosophy
Philosophy by year